The Liberation Tower is a 372-meter-high or 1,220 feet tall telecommunications tower in Kuwait City, Kuwait. It is the second-tallest structure in the country and the 39th tallest building in the world. The tower is not publicly accessible to tourists. However, the complex building attached to the tower houses government offices such as the Communication and Information Technology Regulatory Authority and a government service center that offer civil services related to Ministry of Interior, Ministry of Foreign Affairs, Public Authority For Civil Information, Ministry of Justice, Public Institution for Social Security, Ministry of Commerce and Industry, Fire Service Directorate, and Ministry of Social Affairs and Labour.

History

Originally intended to be named The Kuwait Telecommunications Tower, construction of the tower commenced before the Iraqi invasion of Kuwait on August 2, 1990. When the invasion took place, construction, which was almost half-way complete, was put on hold. However, the structure received no damage, and construction resumed after Iraqi forces were expelled on February 27, 1991. Upon completion in 1993, the tower was renamed the Liberation Tower, symbolizing Kuwait's liberation from Iraq.

Gallery

See also
List of tallest buildings in Kuwait
List of tallest buildings and structures in the world

References

External links
 

1993 establishments in Kuwait
Buildings and structures in Kuwait City
Towers in Kuwait
Gulf War
Towers with revolving restaurants
Towers completed in 1993